Irina Ivanovna Saltykova (née Sapronova, born 5 May 1966) is a Russian pop singer and a former member of the music group Mirage, which was popular in Russia in the 1990s. She released six albums and four singles. Saltykova also did some acting, particularly in the film Brother 2. In June 2000, Saltykova was featured in Russian Playboy.

Life
Irina Ivanovna Sapronova was born in the city of Donskoy, Tula Oblast, in the then Soviet Union. During school years she successfully engaged in artistic gymnastics. Sapronova also attended cutting, sewing and knitting classes. In 1985, she graduated from the Civil Engineering College, and in 1990, from the Moscow Civil Engineering Institute. In 1985, Sapronova met her future husband, singer Viktor Saltykov in Sochi. In 1987, Saltykova gave birth to a daughter, Alisa. In the beginning of the 1990s Saltykova's marriage broke apart. In 1994, Saltykova debuted as a solo artist.

Starting from 2000, Saltykova appeared in films and TV series Brother 2 (2000), Russky spetsnaz (Russian SWAT, 2002), Provintsialy (Provincials, 2002),  Dayosh molodyozh! (Let's Do It, Youth!, 2009–2013) and Pilot mezhdunarodnykh avialiniy (The Pilot of International Airlines, 2011).

Discography

Albums
Serye glaza (Gray Eyes, 1995)
Golubye glazki (Blue Eyes, 1996)
Alisa (1998)
Sudba... (Fate, 2001)
Ya tvoya (I'm Yours, 2004)
Byla Ne byla (Come What May, 2008)

Singles
"Serye glaza (Gray Eyes, 1995)
"Za mnoi" ("Follow me", 2016)
"Slovo No" ("The Word But", 2018)
"Devchenki" ("Girls", 2018)

CompilationsThe Best (1998)...Dlya tebya (12 luchshikh videoklipov) (For You, 12 Best Music Videos'', 2007)

References

External links
Official website (in Russian)

1966 births
Russian women singers
Russian pop singers
Living people
People from Donskoy, Tula Oblast
Playboy people
Winners of the Golden Gramophone Award
Moscow State University of Economics, Statistics, and Informatics alumni